"Staring at the Sun" is a song recorded by American singer-songwriter Anastacia from her sixth studio album, Resurrection (2014). It was written by Louis Biancaniello, Marley Munroe and Sam Watters and produced by the Watters  and Biancaniello. The song was digitally released by BMG Rights as the second single from the album on August 25, 2014.

Critical reception
According to Marcus Floyd of Renowned for Sound, "Staring at the Sun" is a "strong opening number" for the album where "you can hear and relate to the pain Anastacia clearly expresses with that voice of hers". Stating that the song recalls the "Anastacia’s signature sound", Pip Ellwood-Hughes of Entertainment Focus wrote that "Staring at the Sun" with her "powerful" and "soulful" vocals tear through a midtempo beat signalling that she’s back and ready to take on the charts once again. Jazz Tangcay of So So Gay considers the "perfect" song to open the album. Tangcay also stressed the vocal performance of singer in "Staring at the Sun", writing "it serves as a reminder to its listeners of just who Anastascia is and just what she’s vocally capable of". Paul Leake of Click Music comments that in the song Anastacia instead of focusing on the sad moments of her breakdown of her marriage, she use your voice to show their "undeniable resilience".

Music video
On September 17, 2014, a music video for the song was released on Anastacia's official YouTube account. The music video for "Staring at the Sun" was directed by DJay Brawner and producer Anthem Films. On October 24, 2014, was released a music video for "Staring at the Sun (Digital Dog Remix)", which was directed by Ricki Neil.

Formats and track listings
Digital EP
 "Staring at the Sun" – 3:43
 "Staring at the Sun" (Acapella) – 3:30
 "Staring at the Sun" (Instrumental) - 3:43
 "Staring at the Sun" (Digital Dog Club Mix) - 5:42

Digital Remix EP
 "Staring at the Sun" (Radio Edit) – 3:43
 "Staring at the Sun" (The Cube Guys Remix) – 6:07
 "Staring at the Sun" (The Cube Guys Dub) - 6:07
 "Staring at the Sun" (Digital Dog Club Mix) - 5:42

Credits and personnel
Credits taken from Resurrection liner notes.
Vocals: Anastacia
Background vocals: Felicia Barton
Writing: Louis Biancaniello, Marley Munroe, Sam Watters
Producing: Sam Watters, Louis Biancaniello
Keyboards and programming: Louis Biancaniello
Mixed: Al Clay at Westside Pacific
Mastered: Pat Sullivan at Bernie Grundman

Charts

Release history

References

External links

2014 songs
Songs written by Louis Biancaniello
Songs written by Sam Watters
Anastacia songs